Jean-Marc Desgent is a poet, novelist and literary critic. He was a professor at Collège Édouard-Montpetit from 1978 to 2011. He lives in Montreal, Quebec.

Works 
 
 
 
 
 
 
 
 Ce que je suis devant personne, Les Écrits des Forges, 1994, Trois-Rivières, Qc, Canada, 50 pages
 
 
 
 Errances (en collaboration avec Guy Lanoue), Essai, ethnologie, Éditions du Musée canadien des civilisations, 2005, Ottawa, On, Canada, 170 pages
 
 
 
 
 Artaud-Gauvreau, Essai, Poètes de brousse, 2010, Montréal, Qc, Canada, 70 pages
 Qu'importe maintenant, Poètes de brousse, 2012, Montréal, Qc, Canada, 62 pages
 Ne calme pas les dragons, Éditions de la Grenouillère, 2013, Saint-Sauveur-des-Monts, Qc, Canada, 81 pages

Honors 
 1994 - Grand Prix du Festival international de la poésie
 2000 - Prix Rina-Lasnier
 2002 - Prix Félix-Antoine-Savard
 2005 - Grand Prix du Festival international de la poésie - Prix du Gouverneur général - Prix Estuaire des Terrasses Saint-Sulpice
 2006 - Prix Jaime Sabinès/Gatien Lapointe
 2010 - Prix International de Poésie Antonio-Viccaro (Paris)
 2012 - Prix de la Bande à Mœbius
 2013 - Prix d'excellence - section poésie - de la SODEP
 2020 - Prix Alain-Grandbois

References

Writers from Montreal
Canadian male poets
Canadian male novelists
20th-century Canadian poets
20th-century Canadian male writers
21st-century Canadian poets
Canadian poets in French
Canadian novelists in French
Governor General's Award-winning poets
Living people
21st-century Canadian male writers
Year of birth missing (living people)